Camisano Vicentino is a town in the province of Vicenza, Veneto, northern Italy.

Twin towns — sister cities
Camisano Vicentino is twinned with:
  Fuerte Olimpo, Paraguay (2011)

References

 

Cities and towns in Veneto